The Bigelow House may refer to a number of historic houses, namely:

Charles H. Bigelow House, Findlay, Ohio
Daniel R. Bigelow House, Olympia, Washington
Henry Bigelow House, Newton, Massachusetts
Dr. Henry Jacob Bigelow House, Newton, Massachusetts